The 2008–09 Notre Dame Fighting Irish men's basketball team represents the University of Notre Dame in the 2008-09 college basketball season, competing in the Big East Conference. The team is led by ninth-year head coach, Mike Brey, and plays their home games in the Edmund P. Joyce Center in Notre Dame, Indiana.

Preseason

Roster changes and recruiting
Notre Dame lost senior forward and team captain Rob Kurz to graduation. Freshman guard Ty Proffit left Notre Dame and transferred to another school Notre Dame had two players transfer in and they will sit out this season per NCAA rules for transfer students.
 Scott Martin, a 6-8 swingman, transferred after his freshman season at Purdue. Playing mainly off the bench, he averaged 8.5 points and 3.8 rebounds. He has three years of eligibility remaining.
 Ben Hansbrough, a 6-3 guard, transferred after his sophomore season at Mississippi State, and will have two years of eligibility remaining. The younger brother of North Carolina superstar Tyler Hansbrough, he comes off a sophomore season in which he averaged 10.5 points, 3.8 rebounds, and 2.6 assists as a regular starter.

Notre Dame did not sign any recruits from high school for the 2008-09 class.

Preseason outlook
With returning Big East Player of The Year Luke Harangody, the Irish were picked to finish fourth in the Big East conference by the Big East coach's poll.  Harangody was also a unanimous first-team all-Big East selection and was picked to repeat as player of the year.  Senior point guard Kyle McAlarney also made first-team all-Big East selection.  Notre Dame is also looking to keep its 37 consecutive home game win streak alive.

Notre Dame was selected as the pre-season No. 9 team in the country in the USAToday/ESPN preseason coaches poll, the program's highest ever preseason ranking in that poll.  The Irish also debuted at No. 9 in the AP preseason poll, the fifth time Notre Dame has been ranked in the top 10 of that poll and its first top 10 ranking since the 1980–81 season.

Regular season

Roster

Hansbrough and Martin are not eligible to play due to NCAA transfer rules.

Coaches

*Solomon returns to the staff for his fourth year after a previous stint from 2000 to 2003.

Schedule and Results

|-
!colspan=12 style=|Regular season

|-
!colspan=12 style=|Big East tournament

|-
!colspan=12 style=|National Invitational Tournament

Rankings

References

Notre Dame
Notre Dame
Notre Dame Fighting Irish men's basketball seasons
Notre Dame Fighting Irish men's b
Notre Dame Fighting Irish men's b